Russ Bradley (born 17 November 1965) is a British strongman competitor, notable for his appearance at the 1997 World's Strongest Man, multiple British strength titles and his numerous Guinness world records.

References

1965 births
Living people
English strength athletes
Sportspeople from Worcester, England